Messapia was a town in Ozolian Locris.

Its site is unlocated.

References

Populated places in Ozolian Locris
Former populated places in Greece
Lost ancient cities and towns